Events from the year 1971 in Sweden

Incumbents
 Monarch – Gustaf VI Adolf 
 Prime Minister – Olof Palme

Events

 11–12 May – The Elm Conflict in Stockholm.

Births

 8 January – Jesper Jansson, footballer
 1 May – Eva Lund, curler, Olympic champion in 2006 and 2010.
 19 May – Peter Boström, music producer and songwriter, co-writer of Euphoria
 5 November – Mårten Olander, golfer.
 7 November – Martin Björk, television presenter.
 9 November – Melinda Kinnaman, actress.
 25 November – Magnus Arvedson, hockey player

Deaths
 2 November – Hjalmar Andersson, athlete (born 1889).

References

 
Sweden
Years of the 20th century in Sweden